Manapparai taluk  is a taluk of Tiruchirapalli district of the Indian state of Tamil Nadu. The headquarters of the taluk is the town of Manapparai.

Demographics
According to the 2011 census, the taluk of Manapparai had a population of 370,482 with 184,674  males and 185,808 females. There were 1006 women for every 1000 men. The taluk had a literacy rate of 66.4. Child population in the age group below 6 was 20,397 Males and 19,428 Females.

References 

Taluks of Tiruchirapalli district